Ophtalmoplon is a genus of beetles in the family Cerambycidae, containing the following species:

 Ophtalmoplon aurivillii Martins, 1965
 Ophtalmoplon diversum Martins, 1965
 Ophtalmoplon impunctatum Martins, 1965
 Ophtalmoplon inerme Martins, 1965
 Ophtalmoplon nigricorne Napp & Martins, 1985
 Ophtalmoplon simile Martins, Galileo & de-Oliveira, 2009
 Ophtalmoplon spinosum Martins, 1965

References

Ibidionini